This page provide summaries for the 1985 CFU Championship.

First qualifying round

Group 1

Group 2
 Guadeloupe qualified.

Known results:

Group 3

Second qualifying round
The winner of each group in the first round qualified to the second round.

 Guadeloupe and Suriname qualified to the finals;
 Martinique qualified as holders; Barbados qualified as hosts.

Final tournament
The final stage was hosted in Barbados

References
RSSSF archives

Caribbean Cup
CFU
1985 in Barbados